The FIFA Fair Play Award is a FIFA recognition of exemplary behaviour that promotes the spirit of fair play and compassion in :association football around the world. First awarded in 1987, it has been presented to individuals (including posthumously), teams, fans, spectators, football associations/federations and even entire footballing communities. One or more awards are presented annually, with there being at least one recipient each year except in 1994, when no award was presented.

Winners

Notes
 – The Werder Bremen player admitted handball in the penalty area to the referee in a German League match against 1. FC Köln on 7 May 1988. Cologne went on to win the match 2–0.
 – Caroline Hanlon accepted on behalf of the supporters.
In 2010 the Football Association of Ireland (FAI) refused the offer of a Fair Play award following the France and Republic of Ireland 2010 World Cup Play-offs handball controversy. CEO of the FAI John Delaney called FIFA President Sepp Blatter "an embarrassment to himself and an embarrassment to FIFA" for his handling and comments following the controversy.

References

External links
 FIFA Fair Play Award

Association football fair play awards
Fair Play Award
Sportsmanship trophies and awards
Awards established in 1987
The Best FIFA Football Awards